Persona: A Biography of Yukio Mishima is a 2012 biography of Yukio Mishima written by Naoki Inose with Hiroaki Sato, and published by Stone Bridge Press. It is an expanded adaptation in English of Inose's 1995 Mishima biography, Persona: Mishima Yukio den, published by Bungeishunjū in Tokyo, Japan.

Table of contents

 "Prologue"
 "Peasant Ancestors and Grandfather"
 "Samurai Ancestors and Grandmother"
 "The Boy Who Writes Poems"
 "Literary Correspondents"
 "First Love"
 "The War and Its Aftermath"
 "To Be a Bureaucrat or a Writer"
 "Confessions"
 "Boyfriends, Girlfriends"
 "Going Overseas"
 "The Girlfriend"
 "The Kinkakuji"
 "Overseas Again"
 "Marriage"
 "Kyoko's House"
 "The 2.26 Incident, Yukoku
 "Assassinations"
 "Contretemps"
 "The Nobel Prize"
 "Shinpuren, Men of the Divine Wind"
 "The Way of the Warrior is to die"
 "Death in India"
 "The Anti-Vietnam War Movement"
 "Sun and Steel"
 "The Shield Society, Counterrevolution"
 "The Yakuza"
 "Wang Yangming: 'To know is to act
 "The Constitution"
 "Hailstones, Ghouls, Golden Death"
 "Toward Ichigaya"
 "The Seppuku"
 "Epilogue

Reception
After the book's release in 2012, it garnered positive reviews from the press. Paul McCarthy of The Japan Times said, "Those who are interested in the brilliantly gifted writer of mid-20th century Japan who is its subject will learn much from this volume, and should be stimulated to go back and read, or re-read, what Yukio Mishima has left us." Allan Massie, writing for The Wall Street Journal, said, "Mr. Inose doesn't attempt to explain Mishima's grisly end—it may be that the Japanese reader needs no such explanation—but does show him to have been an extraordinary man, in many respects a sympathetic one, and a writer of extraordinary range."

References

2012 non-fiction books
Yukio Mishima
Biographies about LGBT people
Books about writers
Stone Bridge Press books